The Valle Grana is a valley in the province of Cuneo, Piedmont, northern Italy.

Etymology 
The valley takes its name form the Grana stream, a left-hand tributary of the Maira which flows through the valley.

Geography 
It is located between the Val Maira from the north and the Valle Stura di Demonte on the south. Starting from Caraglio, in the plain, it has a length of some 24 km until the Colle Fauniera (also known as Colle dei Morti), at 2,511 m.

Other comuni in the valley include Valgrana, Monterosso Grana, Pradleves and Castelmagno. In the latter's territory is the Sanctuary of San Magno, a notable religious building at 1,761 m of altitude. The highest peak is the Monte Tibert (2,647 m).

See also 
 Cottian Alps

Grana
Grana